The Women's 200m individual medley event at the 2010 South American Games was held on March 26, with the heats at 11:08 and the Final at 18:49.

Medalists

Records

Results

Heats

Final

References
Heats
Final

Medley 200m W